Andrew Bain may refer to:

Andrew Bain (horn player), horn player with the Los Angeles Philharmonic
Andrew Bain (singer), British singing dentist
Andrew Bain (drummer), Scottish drummer
Andrew Geddes Bain (1797–1864), South African geologist, road engineer, palaeontologist and explorer
Andrew Moon Bain, Americanl artist and record producer